Pseudohistory is a form of pseudoscholarship that attempts to distort or misrepresent the historical record, often by employing methods resembling those used in scholarly historical research. The related term cryptohistory is applied to pseudohistory derived from the superstitions intrinsic to occultism. Pseudohistory is related to pseudoscience and pseudoarchaeology, and usage of the terms may occasionally overlap. Although pseudohistory comes in many forms, scholars have identified many features that tend to be common in pseudohistorical works; one example is that the use of pseudohistory is almost always motivated by a contemporary political, religious, or personal agenda. Pseudohistory also frequently presents sensational claims or a big lie about historical facts which would require unwarranted revision of the historical record.

A common feature of pseudohistory is an underlying premise that there is a conspiracy among scholars to promote so-called "mainstream history" over "true" history, an assertion commonly corroborated by elaborate conspiracy theories. Works of pseudohistory often point exclusively to unreliable sources—including myths and legends, often treated as literal historical truth—to support the thesis being promoted while ignoring valid sources that contradict it. Sometimes a work of pseudohistory will adopt a position of historical relativism, insisting that there is really no such thing as historical truth and that any hypothesis is just as good as any other. Many works of pseudohistory conflate mere possibility with actuality, assuming that if something could have happened, then it did.

Notable examples of pseudohistory include British Israelism, the Lost Cause of the Confederacy, the Irish slaves myth, the witch-cult, Armenian genocide denial, Holocaust denial, the clean Wehrmacht myth, the 16th- and 17th-century Spanish Black Legend, and the claim that the Katyn massacre was not committed by the Soviet NKVD.

Definition and etymology
The term pseudohistory was coined in the early nineteenth century, which makes the word older than the related terms pseudo-scholarship and pseudoscience. In an attestation from 1815, it is used to refer to the Contest of Homer and Hesiod, a purportedly historical narrative describing an entirely fictional contest between the Greek poets Homer and Hesiod. The pejorative sense of the term, labelling a flawed or disingenuous work of historiography, is found in another 1815 attestation. Pseudohistory is akin to pseudoscience in that both forms of falsification are achieved using the methodology that purports to, but does not, adhere to the established standards of research for the given field of intellectual enquiry of which the pseudoscience claims to be a part, and which offers little or no supporting evidence for its plausibility.

Writers Michael Shermer and Alex Grobman define pseudohistory as "the rewriting of the past for present personal or political purposes". Other writers take a broader definition; Douglas Allchin, a historian of science, contends that when the history of scientific discovery is presented in a simplified way, with drama exaggerated and scientists romanticized, this creates wrong stereotypes about how science works, and in fact constitutes pseudohistory, despite being based on real facts.

Characteristics
Robert Todd Carroll has developed a list of criteria to identify pseudo-historic works. He states that:

Nicholas Goodrick-Clarke prefers the term "cryptohistory". He identifies two necessary elements as "a complete ignorance of the primary sources" and the repetition of "inaccuracies and wild claims".

Other common characteristics of pseudohistory are:
 The arbitrary linking of disparate events so as to form – in the theorist's opinion – a pattern.  This is typically then developed into a conspiracy theory postulating a hidden agent responsible for creating and maintaining the pattern. For example, the pseudohistorical The Holy Blood and the Holy Grail links the Knights Templar, the medieval Grail Romances, the Merovingian Frankish dynasty and the artist Nicolas Poussin in an attempt to identify lineal descendants of Jesus.
 Hypothesising the consequences of unlikely events that "could" have happened, thereby assuming tacitly that they did.
 Sensationalism, or shock value
 Cherry picking evidence that helps the historical argument being made and suppressing evidence that hurts it.

Categories and examples

The following are some common categories of pseudohistorical theory, with examples.  Note that not all theories in a listed category are necessarily pseudohistorical; they are rather categories that seem to attract pseudohistorians.

Ancient aliens, ancient technologies, and lost lands

Immanuel Velikovsky's books Worlds in Collision (1950), Ages in Chaos (1952), and Earth in Upheaval (1955), which became "instant bestsellers", demonstrated that pseudohistory based on ancient mythology held potential for tremendous financial success and became models of success for future works in the genre.

In 1968, Erich von Däniken published Chariots of the Gods?, which claims that ancient visitors from outer space constructed the pyramids and other monuments. He has since published other books in which he makes similar claims. These claims have all been categorized as pseudohistory. Similarly, Zechariah Sitchin has published numerous books claiming that a race of extraterrestrial beings from the Planet Nibiru known as the Anunnaki visited Earth in ancient times in search of gold, and that they genetically engineered humans to serve as their slaves. He claims that memories of these occurrences are recorded in Sumerian mythology, as well as other mythologies all across the globe. These speculations have likewise been categorized as pseudohistory.

The ancient astronaut hypothesis was further popularized in the United States by the History Channel television series Ancient Aliens. History professor Ronald H. Fritze observed that the pseudohistorical claims promoted by von Däniken and the Ancient Aliens program have a periodic popularity in the US: "In a pop culture with a short memory and a voracious appetite, aliens and pyramids and lost civilizations are recycled like fashions."

The author Graham Hancock has sold over four million copies of books promoting the pseudohistorical thesis that all the major monuments of the ancient world, including Stonehenge, the Egyptian pyramids, and the moai of Easter Island, were built by a single ancient supercivilization, which Hancock claims thrived from 15,000 to 10,000 BC and possessed technological and scientific knowledge equal to or surpassing that of modern civilization. He first advanced the full form of this argument in his 1995 bestseller Fingerprints of the Gods, which won popular acclaim, but scholarly disdain. Christopher Knight has published numerous books, including Uriel's Machine (2000), expounding pseudohistorical assertions that ancient civilizations possessed technology far more advanced than the technology of today.

The claim that a lost continent known as Lemuria once existed in the Pacific Ocean has likewise been categorized as pseudohistory.

Antisemitic pseudohistory

The Protocols of the Learned Elders of Zion is a fraudulent work purporting to show a historical conspiracy for world domination by Jews. The work was conclusively proven to be a forgery in August 1921, when The Times revealed that extensive portions of the document were directly plagiarized from Maurice Joly's 1864 satirical dialogue The Dialogue in Hell Between Machiavelli and Montesquieu, as well as Hermann Goedsche's 1868 anti-Semitic novel Biarritz.

The Khazar theory is an academic fringe theory that postulates that the bulk of European Jewry are of Central Asian (Turkic) origin. In spite of mainstream academic consensus conclusively rejecting it, this theory has been promoted in Anti-Semitic and some Anti-Zionist circles, arguing that Jews are an alien element both in Europe and in Palestine.

Holocaust denial and genocide denial in general are widely categorized as pseudohistory. Major proponents of Holocaust denial include David Irving and others, who argue that the Holocaust, Holodomor, Armenian genocide, Assyrian genocide, Greek genocide and other genocides did not occur, or were exaggerated greatly.

Alternative chronologies
An alternative chronology is a revised sequence of events that deviates from the standard timeline of world history accepted by mainstream scholars. An example of an "alternative chronology" is Anatoly Fomenko's New Chronology, which claims that recorded history actually began around AD 800 and all events that allegedly occurred prior to that point either never really happened at all or are simply inaccurate retellings of events that happened later. One of its outgrowths is the Tartary conspiracy theory. Other, less extreme examples, are the phantom time hypothesis, which asserts that the years AD 614–911 never took place; and the New Chronology of David Rohl, which claims that the accepted timelines for ancient Egyptian and Israelite history are wrong.

Ethnocentric revisionism

Most Afrocentric (i.e. Pre-Columbian Africa-Americas contact theories, see Ancient Egyptian race controversy) ideas have been identified as pseudohistorical, alongside the "Indigenous Aryans" theories published by Hindu nationalists during the 1990s and 2000s.<ref>{{Cite journal|first=Meera|last= Nanda|title=Response to my critics|journal= Social Epistemology|volume= 19|issue=1|date= January–March 2005|url=http://physics.nyu.edu/faculty/sokal/Nanda_SocEpist.pdf|pages=147–91|doi=10.1080/02691720500084358|s2cid= 10045510}}
</ref> The "crypto-history" developed within Germanic mysticism and Nazi occultism has likewise been placed under this categorization. Among leading Nazis, Heinrich Himmler is believed to have been influenced by occultism and according to one theory, developed the SS base at Wewelsburg in accordance with an esoteric plan. Other Nationalist histories have strong pseudohistorical influences, including Kurdish, Albanian, Turkish, Arab and Germanic.

The Sun Language Theory is a pseudohistorical ideology which argues that all languages are descended from a form of proto-Turkish. The theory may have been partially devised in order to legitimize Arabic and Semitic loanwords occurring in the Turkish language by instead asserting that the Arabic and Semitic words were derived from the Turkish ones rather than vice versa.

A large number of nationalist pseudohistorical theories deal with the legendary Ten Lost Tribes of ancient Israel. British-Israelism, also known as Anglo-Israelism, the most famous example of this type, has been conclusively refuted by mainstream historians using evidence from a vast array of different fields of study.

Another form of ethnocentric revisionism is nationalistic pseudohistory. The "Ancient Macedonians continuity theory" is one such pseudohistorical theory, which postulates demographic, cultural and linguistic continuity between Macedonians of antiquity and the main ethnic group in present-day North Macedonia. Also, the Bulgarian medieval dynasty of the Komitopules, which ruled the First Bulgarian Empire in its last decades, is presented as "Macedonian", ruling a "medieval Macedonian state", because of the location of its capitals in Macedonia.

Historical falsification

In the eighth century, a forged document known as Donation of Constantine, which supposedly transferred authority over Rome and the western part of the Roman Empire to the Pope, became widely circulated. In the twelfth century, Geoffrey of Monmouth published the History of the Kings of Britain, a pseudohistorical work purporting to describe the ancient history and origins of the British people. The book synthesises earlier Celtic mythical traditions to inflate the deeds of the mythical King Arthur. The contemporary historian William of Newburgh wrote around 1190 that "it is quite clear that everything this man wrote about Arthur and his successors, or indeed about his predecessors from Vortigern onwards, was made up, partly by himself and partly by others".

Historical revisionism
The Shakespeare authorship question is a fringe theory that claims that the works attributed to William Shakespeare were actually written by someone other than William Shakespeare of Stratford-upon-Avon.Potter, Lois. "Marlowe onstage" in Constructing Christopher Marlowe, James Alan Downie and J. T. Parnell, eds. (2000, 2001), paperback ed., 88–101; 100: "The possibility that Shakespeare may not really be Shakespeare, comic in the context of literary history and pseudo-history, is understandable in this world of double-agents . . ."Kathman, David. Shakespeare Authorship Page: "... Shakespeare scholars regard Oxfordianism as pseudo-scholarship which arbitrarily discards the methods used by real historians. ... In order to support their beliefs, Oxfordians resort to a number of tactics which will be familiar to observers of other forms of pseudo-history and pseudo-science."

Another example of historical revisionism is the thesis, found in the writings of David Barton and others, asserting that the United States was founded as an exclusively Christian nation. Mainstream historians instead support the traditional position, which holds that the American founding fathers intended for church and state to be kept separate.

Confederate revisionists (a.k.a. Civil War revisionists), "Lost Cause" advocates, and Neo-Confederates argue that the Confederate States of America's prime motivation was the maintenance of states' rights and limited government, rather than the preservation and expansion of slavery.

Connected to the Lost Cause is the Irish slaves myth, a pseudo-historical narrative which conflates the experiences of Irish indentured servants and enslaved Africans in the Americas. This myth, which was historically promoted by Irish nationalists such as John Mitchel, has in the modern-day been promoted by white supremacists in the United States to minimize the mistreatment experienced by African Americans (such as racism and segregation) and oppose demands for  slavery reparations. The myth has also been used to obscure and downplay Irish involvement in the transatlantic slave trade.

Matriarchy

The consensus among academics is that no strictly matriarchal society is known to have existed. Anthropologist Donald Brown's list of human cultural universals (viz., features shared by nearly all current human societies) includes men being the "dominant element" in public political affairs, which is the contemporary opinion of mainstream anthropology.  
Some societies are matrilineal or matrifocal but in fact have patriarchal power structures, which may be misidentified as matriarchal.
The idea that matriarchal societies existed and they preceded patriarchal societies was first raised in the 19th-century among Western academics, but it has since been discredited. 

Despite this however, some second-wave feminists assert that a matriarchy preceded the patriarchy. The Goddess Movement 
and Riane Eisler's The Chalice and the Blade cite Venus figurines as evidence that societies of paleolithic and neolithic Europe  were matriarchies that worshipped a goddess. This belief is not supported by mainstream academics.

Pre-Columbian trans-oceanic contact theories

Excluding the Norse colonization of the Americas and other reputable scholarship, most theories of pre-Columbian trans-oceanic contact have been classified as pseudohistory, including claims that the Americas were actually discovered by Arabs or Muslims. Gavin Menzies' book 1421: The Year China Discovered the World, which argues for the idea that Chinese sailors discovered America, has also been categorized as a work of pseudohistory.

Psychohistory

Mainstream historians have categorized psychohistory as pseudohistory. Psychohistory is an amalgam of psychology, history, and related social sciences and the humanities. Its stated goal is to examine the "why" of history, especially the difference between stated intention and actual behavior. It also states as its goal the combination of the insights of psychology, especially psychoanalysis, with the research methodology of the social sciences and humanities to understand the emotional origin of the behavior of individuals, groups and nations, past and present.

Racist pseudohistory
Josiah Priest and other nineteenth-century American writers wrote pseudohistorical narratives that portrayed African Americans and Native Americans in an extremely negative light. Priest's first book was The Wonders of Nature and Providence, Displayed (1826). The book is regarded by modern critics as one of the earliest works of modern American pseudohistory. Priest attacked Native Americans in American Antiquities and Discoveries of the West (1833) and African-Americans in Slavery, As It Relates to the Negro (1843). Other nineteenth-century writers, such as Thomas Gold Appleton, in his A Sheaf of Papers (1875), and George Perkins Marsh, in his The Goths in New England, seized upon false notions of Viking history to promote the superiority of white people (as well as to oppose the Catholic Church). Such misuse of Viking history and imagery reemerged in the twentieth century among some groups promoting white supremacy.

Religious pseudohistoryThe Holy Blood and the Holy Grail (1982) by Michael Baigent, Richard Leigh, and Henry Lincoln is a book that purports to show that certain historical figures, such as Godfrey of Bouillon, and contemporary aristocrats are the lineal descendants of Jesus. Mainstream historians have widely panned the book, categorizing it as pseudohistory, and pointing out that the genealogical tables used in it are now known to be spurious. Nonetheless, the book was an international best-seller and inspired Dan Brown's bestselling mystery thriller novel The Da Vinci Code.

Although historians and archaeologists consider the Book of Mormon to be an anachronistic invention of Joseph Smith, many members of The Church of Jesus Christ of Latter-day Saints (LDS Church) believe that it describes ancient historical events in the Americas.

Searches for Noah's Ark have also been categorized as pseudohistory.

In her books, starting with The Witch-Cult in Western Europe (1921), English author Margaret Murray claimed that the witch trials in the early modern period were actually an attempt by chauvinistic Christians to annihilate a secret, pagan religion, which she claimed worshipped a Horned God. Murray's claims have now been widely rejected by respected historians. Nonetheless, her ideas have become the foundation myth for modern Wicca, a contemporary Neopagan religion. Belief in Murray's alleged witch-cult is still prevalent among Wiccans, but is gradually declining.

The Christ myth theory claims that Jesus of Nazareth never existed as a historical figure and that his existence was invented by early Christians. This argument currently finds very little support among scholars and historians of all faiths and has been described as pseudohistorical.Robert M. Price (an atheist who denies the existence of Jesus) agrees that this perspective runs against the views of the majority of scholars: Robert M. Price "Jesus at the Vanishing Point" in The Historical Jesus: Five Views edited by James K. Beilby & Paul Rhodes Eddy, 2009 InterVarsity,  p. 61Richard A. Burridge states: "There are those who argue that Jesus is a figment of the Church’s imagination, that there never was a Jesus at all. I have to say that I do not know any respectable critical scholar who says that anymore." in Jesus Now and Then by Richard A. Burridge and Graham Gould (Apr 1, 2004)  p. 34Sykes, Stephen W. (2007). "Paul's understanding of the death of Jesus". Sacrifice and Redemption. Cambridge University Press. pp. 35–36. .

Hinduism
The belief that Ancient India was technologically advanced to the extent of being a nuclear power is gaining popularity in India. Emerging extreme nationalist trends and  ideologies based on Hinduism in the political arena promote these discussions. Vasudev Devnani, the education minister for the western state of Rajasthan, said in January 2017 that it was important to "understand the scientific significance" of the cow, as it was the only animal in the world to both inhale and exhale oxygen. In 2014, Prime Minister Narendra Modi told a gathering of doctors and medical staff at a Mumbai hospital that the story of the Hindu god Ganesha showed genetic science existed in ancient India. Many new age pseudohistorians who focus on converting mythological stories into history are well received among the crowd.   Indian Science Congress ancient aircraft controversy is a related event when Capt. Anand J. Bodas, retired principal of a pilot training facility, claimed that aircraft more advanced than today's versions existed in ancient India at the Indian Science Congress.

As a topic of study

Pseudohistory is offered as an undergraduate course in liberal arts settings, one example being in Claremont McKenna College.

See also
  
 List of pseudohistorians
 Pseudoscientific metrology
Disinformation

References

External links

 "Pseudohistory and Pseudoscience" Program in the History of Science and Technology, University of Minnesota, Minneapolis, Minnesota, United States.
 Pseudohistory entry at Skeptic's Dictionary
 The Hall of Ma'at
 "The Restoration of History" from the American Skeptic'' magazine.

 
Fringe theory
Barriers to critical thinking
Fiction